Ribosomal oxygenase 2 is a protein that in humans is encoded by the RIOX2 gene.

References

Further reading